Pixley National Wildlife Refuge is located  south of Tulare, California and  north of Bakersfield in the San Joaquin Valley. The  nature refuge represents one of the few remaining examples of the grasslands, vernal pools, and playas that once bordered historic Tulare Lake, the largest lake west of the Great Lakes until the late 19th century.

Wildlife
Over 100 bird and 6 reptile species use the wildlife refuge. Approximately  of managed Wetlands provide habitat for migratory waterfowl and shorebirds. Threatened and endangered species include the San Joaquin kit fox, blunt-nosed leopard lizard, Tipton kangaroo rat, and the vernal pool fairy shrimp.

Access
Refuge visitation is by special arrangement only.

References
official Pixley National Wildlife Refuge website
Pixley National Wildlife Refuge: Profile

National Wildlife Refuges in California
Parks in the San Joaquin Valley
Protected areas of Tulare County, California
Wetlands of California
Protected areas established in 1959
1959 establishments in California
Landforms of Tulare County, California